Slovakia qualified twice as an independent nation for a UEFA European Championship since the dissolution of Czechoslovakia and its national team in 1993, the first time being the 2016 edition, and again in the following Euro 2020 tournament. They directly qualified in 2016 after finishing second in their qualifying group. For the draw of the end stage that took place on 12 December 2015, they were seeded in Pot 3.

Euro 2016

Group stage

Ranking of third-placed teams

Knockout phase

Round of 16

Euro 2020

Group stage

Ranking of third-placed teams

Overall record 

*Denotes draws including knockout matches decided via penalty shoot-out.

See also

 Czech Republic at the UEFA European Championship

References

 
Countries at the UEFA European Championship